Shahrak-e Baba Abbas (also Romanized as Shahraḵ-e Bābā ‘Abbās; also known as Bābā ‘Abbās, Bābā ‘Abbās-e Daym, and Bābā ‘Abbās-e Bālā) is a village in Koregah-e Gharbi Rural District, in the Central District of Khorramabad County, Lorestan Province, Iran. At the 2006 census, its population was 1,151, in 263 families.

References 

Towns and villages in Khorramabad County